Lee Jin-hyun (born 26 August 1997) is a South Korean footballer who plays as a midfielder for Daejeon Hana Citizen in the K League 2

Club career

FK Austria Wien
He graduated from Pohang Iron & Steel Elementary School, Pohang Steel Middle School, and Pohang Steel High School, which are affiliated with the Pohang Steelers, and entered Sungkyunkwan University after being selected by the Pohang Steelers in 2016.

On August 11, 2017, Lee Jin-hyun signed with the Austrian Bundesliga side, Austria Wien, on a 1-year loan from Pohang Steelers with 3 year additional purchase option.

On August 27, 2017, Lee Jin-hyun made his debut appearance against FC Admira Wacker and he also scored his debut goal at the 76th minute.

Career statistics

Club

Honours

International
South Korea U23
Asian Games: 2018

International career 
Lee made his debut for the South Korea U-20 national team on 4 January 2015 in a draw against Finland U-20 national team in the 2015 Granatkin Memorial.

He won the gold medal with the South Korea U-23 national team at the 2018 Asian Games.

Notes

References

External links
 

1997 births
Living people
South Korean footballers
South Korean expatriate footballers
Association football midfielders
South Korea under-20 international footballers
South Korea under-23 international footballers
South Korea international footballers
FK Austria Wien players
Pohang Steelers players
Daegu FC players
Daejeon Hana Citizen FC players
Austrian Football Bundesliga players
K League 1 players
K League 2 players
Footballers at the 2018 Asian Games
Asian Games medalists in football
Asian Games gold medalists for South Korea
Medalists at the 2018 Asian Games
People from Pohang
Expatriate footballers in Austria
South Korean expatriate sportspeople in Austria
Sportspeople from North Gyeongsang Province